María Stella Márquez—Araneta (born 17 June 1937) (née Márquez Zawadski), often styled as Madame Stella Márquez de Araneta, is a Colombian pageant director and beauty queen. She grew up in New York City and moved back to Colombia, where she became a pageant titleholder. As Miss Colombia, she was crowned the first Miss International in 1960. She obtained her Filipino citizenship via naturalization in 1970.

Araneta was the former national director of the Miss Universe and current director for Miss International franchises in the Philippines, under the Binibining Pilipinas organization. She also has served as chairman of the Binibining Pilipinas Charities Incorporated for fifty years.

Early life
Araneta was born in Tumaco, Colombia to Arturo Eduardo Márquez Acevedo, from Tumaco and Stella Zawadski Navia, from Valle del Cauca. She moved to the United States in 1954. She is the eldest sibling of two younger sisters. At the time, she was a high school student at Marymount School of New York in Manhattan. Initially, her father, working as a civil engineer decided to take her out of the school to Colombia on a promise of temporary vacation. As a young student, Araneta classified herself as a Gringa, noting that she was completely unable to relate to the Colombian culture, including its national dance Cumbia.

After high school, Araneta enrolled in Marymount College, Tarrytown, New York to continue her major both in psychology and the French language.  In 1957, she gained an honorary prize as a beauty model for Pan American Airlines, though not necessarily a pageant contest. She also represented as Miss Honduras on a local Los Angeles pageant due to its lack of national entry. During that time, she was also sent by the nuns from her school as one of the “court princesses” for the 1957 homecoming event in Loyola Marymount University as a gesture of solidarity among affiliated Catholic schools for women.

Miss Colombia
During her stay in Colombia, Araneta learned the value of social work and became acquainted with the local Roman Catholic Church there to fund charities. The first charity she helped manage was named "Banquet of the Millionaires" through the assistance of a famed Catholic priest, Father Rafael García Herreros (1909—1992). Araneta was chosen as the representative of her country in 1958 by winning three local titles, Miss Tumaco, Miss Nariño and Miss Queen of Spain. Her victory under the department state of Nariño was notable for not having sent a candidate in twelve years while her travel visa permit to stay in Colombia was limited to two months.

During her national competition, she used the Colombian national costume as a Sibundoy Indian princess, wearing a gold headband and a Ruana shawl as a veil. After winning Miss Colombia in 1959, she was personally congratulated and photographed with former Colombian president, Alberto Lleras Camargo.

During the Miss Universe 1960 competition, the swimsuit assigned to her during her national competition was a one piece blue cerulean swimsuit with golden cleavage ornamentation (the other contestants were assigned yellow and pink). Ultimately, she competed and won the title for Señorita Colombia, gaining her access to become the national Colombian representative in Miss Universe 1960 (Top 15 Placement) at 6th-Runner up, then to Miss International 1960 (Winner Placement) of which she won against Miss India, Iona Pinto of Maharashtra by a score margin of half a point (0.5).

Miss International

She became Miss Colombia in 1959 and was able to compete in the Miss Universe 1960 pageant held in Miami Beach, Florida placing as a top 15 semi-finalist, at 6th—runner up placement.

Accordingly, Colombia sent her again as a national representative through the financial patronage of Max Factor cosmetics. As part of the promotional entourage group, she was given a tour with Conrad Hilton Sr. at the new renovation of the Beverly Hilton hotel. Hilton Sr. himself, jokingly asked Araneta if she would consider marrying his firstborn son and hotel heir Conrad Hilton Jr. in case he divorces again from Patricia McClintock, which consequently occurred in 1965.

At age 23, she competed in the first Miss International pageant held in Long Beach, California in 1960, becoming the first Miss International, and also the first Latin American titleholder in that line of pageants. During the press presentation at the former Lafayette Hotel, Araneta openly declared that she preferred to wear a figure-tight swimsuit that would showcase the pageant body she worked hard to achieve rather than the loose playsuits sponsored by the pageant organizers. She won the first evening gown competition out of the three rounds (1/3) at the pageant. Her measurements for the swimsuit competition which paved for her victory was recorded at 95—62—95 at exactly 170 centimeters. Ultimately, she won the title and received the following grand total prizes:

 Cashier's check of $10,000 USD, sponsored by the Mayor and the Port of Long Beach. 
 An 18K karat yellow gold floral ring valued at $3,500 USD.
 A Japanese diamond encrusted wristwatch valued at $300 USD.
 The Miss International pageant trophy, sash and crown.

Accordingly, after winning Miss International 1960, the President of Marymount College, Irish Mother Superior Brendan Mairé McQuillan PhD. sent a formal letter to Araneta requesting her to choose a different school due to her active participation in pageantry, namely the swimsuit competition, deemed still taboo at the time.

After her championship, Araneta decided to her use her fame to work and was hired as a tourist promoter for a European tour package company, as well as an endorser for the New Year’s Day 1961 Rose Bowl and 72nd Tournament of Roses parade in Pasadena, California, where she also met her future husband, Jorge León Araneta. The parade float was titled "Lovely to Look At" and featured Araneta on top of large 17-foot tall fountain with surrounding nine basins of spraying water.

During the Cold War in 1961, she became fearful for her safety and decided to ship back to New York city her most precious belongings, the grand piano of her mother, wedding dresses and wedding crown as well as her evening gown at Miss International 1960 along with its original crown and trophy for safekeeping at her sister's residence. Accordingly, the goods were heavily damaged due to the Hurricane Esther which wrecked the boat in transit.

During the 48th edition of Miss International 2008, Araneta participated as one of the designated panel of judges during the pageant competition held in Macau, China.

Miss Philippines 

She married Jorge León Araneta, a prominent Filipino political figure, at the Metropolitan Cathedral of Saint Peter in Santiago de Cali, Colombia, thereby sharing in five children. Their grand wedding reception was held in Hotel Alferez Real, a well-known hotel in the city, which was demolished in 1972. When Araneta first arrived in Manila, she was dismayed that the country was similar to Hispanic cities and expected a more oriental culture similar to neighboring territories like British Hong Kong and Japan. She toured many parts of the Philippines, then organized by her husband through the Manila City Hall but notes that she was also dismayed at the wide practice of telephone tapping at the time, claiming that private telephone conversations between her husband would be reported in Filipino tabloids the next day.

She was assigned by her father-in-law Jesus Amado Araneta y Sitchon to the post in June 1964, on her 28th birthday. Since 1964, she has been the organizer of Binibining Pilipinas (English: "Maiden Philippines or Miss Philippines"), which sends its winners to the Miss Universe and Miss International competitions. After the victory of Miss Philippines as the  18th Miss Universe in 1969, Araneta formally obtained her  Filipino citizenship in the following year of 1970.

Araneta is also a principal sponsor to the Roman Catholic wedding of Binibining Pilipinas Universe 2011, Shamcey Supsup. In 2019, after fifty years of service, Supsup succeeded Araneta for the Philippine franchise of Miss Universe.

Controversy
Araneta’s tenure as a national director is not without controversy. Former pageant candidates have been known to be disqualified at her final decision, often as a result of an immorality clause in the pageant contracts associated with sexualized photos discovered in the media during or after the pageant or the inability to obtain or renew a Philippine passport.

Notable among this is in 1982,  when Maria Isabel Lopez claimed that she was pressured to relinquish her title due to her having worked as a sexy lingerie model in a “Girard Peter Fashion Show” which was revealed post discovery. Nevertheless, Lopez maintained her tenacity and went to compete in at the 31st Miss Universe pageant. Similar cases of various other candidates occurred over the years, as disqualified for varying reasons ranging from sexualized photos irrespective of intent such as artistic creativity, charity purposes, or product endorsement (sexualized calendars) or direct self-pornography allegedly often without due process due to the immorality clause implemented by Araneta and her lawyers. 

Disqualified candidates such as Anjanette Abayari of USA (1991), Tisha Silang of Canada (1998) and Maria Venus Raj of Qatar (2010) due to issues of national citizenship having been born in Qatar and the lack of full set of citizenship documents causing the intervention of the Department of Foreign Affairs to make a controversial exception to grant a Philippine passport. Accordingly, Raj competed in 2010 and took placement as the 4th Runner Up in the 59th Miss Universe competition.

Former Miss International Precious Lara Quigaman (2005) claimed on a public televised interview that she was dismissed of her tribute credentials as a winner of Miss International at the coronation night in 2009, allegedly gaining the disapproval of Araneta for starting her own separate national pageant. 

Other notable issues were the refurbishment, restructuring or total re-usage of swimsuit and pageant gowns by candidates, along with the sourcing of evening and national gowns outside the Philippines. In contrast, Araneta maintained that she sourced the pageant gowns abroad due to the mediocrity of local Filipino designers and their previous  attempts to  subvert and usurp her authority when it comes to the national candidates yet noted to considering them in the future if having been re-qualified at a higher finesse and quality standard. After the controversial 2014 national costume worn by Mary Jean Lastimosa (Top 10 Placement), Filipino nationals were officially allowed to procure gowns and the national costume in 2015.

On 12 January 2017, Araneta expressed her disdain of Filipino designers producing any pageant gowns for other countries, deeming them as risk of competition to the national representative. In 2018, at the personal request of the 64th Miss Universe, Araneta designated new crowns and diadems for its national titleholders and the runner-up finalists.

Currently, Binibining Pilipinas owns the franchise of Miss International,  Miss Intercontinental, Miss Grand International, and Miss Globe. In addition, Araneta is the Chargé d'affaires of the Consulate of Colombia to the Philippines in Manila.

To date, Araneta has produced four Miss Universe titleholders, six Miss International winners and numerous semi-finalists placements.

Personal life
Araneta is of Spanish and Polish heritage. She has a fond novelty of collecting premium Emeralds, a gemstone highly valued in her native Colombia. She is also a known traveler, along with her husband.

Other awards
In 2013, Araneta was inducted to the Eastwood City Walk Of Fame in Quezon City, Philippines.

References

External links
 Miss International official website - Past titleholders 

1937 births
Araneta family
Colombian beauty pageant winners
Colombian emigrants to the Philippines
Colombian people of Polish descent
Colombian people of Spanish descent
Living people
Miss Colombia winners
Miss International winners
Miss International 1960 delegates
Miss Universe 1960 contestants
People from Quezon City
People from Tumaco